Nottingham Festival may refer to:

 Nottingham Comedy Festival
 Nottingham Goose Fair
 Nottingham Pride
 Nottingham Robin Hood Beer Festival
 Dot to Dot Festival, a music festival